Exeter Blackfriars  was a Dominican friary in the centre of Exeter, the county town of Devon in England. It was dissolved in 1538.

Burials
John Dinham (1406–1458) and wife Joan Arches (daughter of Richard Arches)
Lady Isabel de Vere Courtenay, Daughter of Hugh de Vere, 4th Earl of Oxford and Hawise de Quincy

See also
 Exeter monastery

References

Monasteries in Devon
Buildings and structures in Exeter
History of Exeter
Dominican monasteries in England